John Royston Evans (born 9 February 1939) is a Welsh footballer, who played as a winger in the Football League for Chester and Halifax Town.

References

Chester City F.C. players
Wrexham A.F.C. players
Halifax Town A.F.C. players
English Football League players
Association football wingers
Witton Albion F.C. players
1939 births
Living people
People from Lampeter
Sportspeople from Ceredigion
Welsh footballers